Retropolitana is the eleventh album by the Portuguese band GNR. It was first announced on April 21, 2010. The first single, "Reis do roque", was released on May 1, 2010.

Track listing
 "Clube dos Encalhados"
 "Outra X"
 "Únika"
 "Reis do Roque"
 "aiTUNES"
 "Burro em Pé"
 "Metropolitana"
 "Baixa/Chicago"
 "Pulseira Electrónica"
 "Nº10"
 "Na Sombra"
 "Tatus Tus"

Charts

References

External links
 http://tv1.rtp.pt/noticias/?t=Novo-album-dos-GNR-vai-chamar-se-Retropolitana.rtp&article=338042&visual=3&layout=10&tm=4

2010 albums